The 2019–20 season is Patronato's 5th consecutive season in the top division of Argentine football. In addition to the Primera División, the club are competing in the Copa Argentina and Copa de la Superliga.

The season generally covers the period from 1 July 2019 to 30 June 2020.

Review

Pre-season
Patronato announced their first two signings in early June 2019. Leandro Marín signed from Lausanne-Sport on 6 June, while Lucas Mancinelli made the move from Temperley on 12 June - with both players officially joining on 3 July. The club's first outgoing was revealed on 17 June, with Swiss centre-back Dylan Gissi signing for Atlético Tucumán. Mathías Abero did the opposite on 19 June, as the Uruguayan penned terms from the San Miguel de Tucumán outfit. Patronato completed the loan capture of central midfielder Julián Chicco from Boca Juniors on 21 June, he was followed in hours later by Christian Chimino from Huracán. Ezequiel Rescaldani left on the same day, joining Arsenal de Sarandí. Also on 21 June, Federico Mancinelli became signing number six.

Cristian Tarragona joined Patronato on 22 June, with the centre-forward coming from Platense in Primera B Nacional. They played their first pre-season friendly later that day, defeating Unión Santa Fe Reserves at home thanks to a Gabriel Ávalos goal. Ignacio Cacheiro and Federico Bravo departed on 24/25 June, penning contracts with Chacarita Juniors and Atlético Tucumán. They and Godoy Cruz drew in an exhibition fixture on 29 June, with a secondary encounter ending in a Godoy win. Matías Ibáñez was loaned from Lanús, while Gabriel Díaz was transferred from Ferro Carril Oeste on 29 June. However, Ferro later announced a deal was still being negotiated amid a new contract offer. Pablo Cortizo signed from Gimnasia y Esgrima (M) on 30 June.

Francisco Apaolaza's loan in from the previous season officially expired on 30 June. Lucas Ceballos moved to Mitre on 1 July, with Santiago Rosales coming into the team on loan from Racing Club later in the day. The incoming of Gabriel Díaz was made formal on 1 July, as Ferro communicated he had signed a new contract but would be loaned to Patronato. Gabriel Carabajal was sold to domestic rivals Unión Santa Fe on 4 July. Cristian Tarragona netted for the first time for Patronato on 4 July in a friendly with Colón. Agustín Guiffrey went on loan to Santamarina on 4 July. On 7 July, Renzo Vera headed off to Gimnasia y Esgrima (M). Banfield were defeated in pre-season on 9 July, in an encounter that followed a goalless draw between them earlier in the day.

Hugo Silveira, a Uruguayan centre-forward from Nacional, joined the club on 11 July. Patronato held Lanús to a friendly draw on 13 July, prior to beating them in a second fixture. Patronato made their thirteenth new signing on 16 July in Dardo Miloc from Aldosivi. Bruno Duarte went away on 17 July, deciding to sign for Tristán Suárez. Also on that date, Patronato had two goalless ties with Talleres in friendlies while Agustín Sandona left for Blooming in Bolivia. 25 July saw Jacobo Mansilla head to Gimnasia y Esgrima (M) in Primera B Nacional.

July
Patronato kicked off their 2019–20 Primera División campaign with a victory over Colón at the Estadio Brigadier General Estanislao López, as Christian Chimino scored on his debut for them on 27 July.

August
Agustín Sufi arrived on a free transfer from Gimnasia y Esgrima (J) on 1 August, with Nicolás Delgadillo coming in on loan from Vélez Sarsfield soon after. Patronato's Copa Argentina encounter with Independiente was postponed, due to their opponent's disagreements with CONMEBOL in regards to their Copa Sudamericana quarter-final tie. Patronato lost 2–0 to Boca Juniors on 4 August, after strikes from Eduardo Salvio and Carlos Tevez. Patronato beat Ateneo Inmaculada in a friendly on 7 August. Patronato, on 9 August, beat and lost to Colón Reserves in exhibitions. Lautaro Geminiani and Abel Peralta left for Independiente Rivadavia and Sarmiento on 13 August. Patronato made it two wins from three in the Primera División on 18 August, defeating Huracán.

Nicolás Pantaleone went to Uruguay with Danubio on 22 August. Patronato's first draw of the season came on 24 August, with the club taking a point off Rosario Central away from home. Patronato were eliminated from the Copa Argentina on 28 August, as Domingo Blanco netted for Independiente in Villa Mercedes. The two met again in the league days later, with Patronato managing to reverse the scoreline for three points.

Squad

Transfers
Domestic transfer windows:3 July 2019 to 24 September 201920 January 2020 to 19 February 2020.

Transfers in

Transfers out

Loans in

Loans out

Friendlies

Pre-season
On 15 June 2019, Patronato announced friendlies with Unión Santa Fe Reserves, Godoy Cruz, Colón, Banfield and Lanús - with the first two taking place at the Estadio Presbítero Bartolomé Grella in Paraná, while the other three would see trips to Santa Fe and Buenos Aires. Exhibition encounters with Talleres were added to their schedule on 11 July.

Mid-season
Friendlies with Ateneo Inmaculada and Colón Reserves were scheduled on 6 August.

Competitions

Primera División

League table

Relegation table

Source: AFA

Results summary

Matches
The fixtures for the 2019–20 campaign were released on 10 July.

Copa Argentina

Independiente were drawn as Patronato's round of thirty-two opponents in the Copa Argentina.

Copa de la Superliga

Squad statistics

Appearances and goals

Statistics accurate as of 31 August 2019.

Goalscorers

Notes

References

Club Atlético Patronato seasons
Patronato